Wisconsin's 2nd congressional district is a congressional district of the United States House of Representatives in southern Wisconsin, covering Dane County, Iowa County, Lafayette County, Sauk County and Green County, as well as portions of Richland County and Rock County. The district includes Madison, the state's capital, its suburbs and some of the surrounding areas. Like many districts anchored by a college town, the district is heavily Democratic, and includes the University of Wisconsin-Madison.

The district is currently represented by Democrat Mark Pocan, who succeeded current Senator Tammy Baldwin in 2013.

Historically, the district has tilted Democratic, due largely to the presence of heavily Democratic Madison.  It was a swing district for much of the 1990s and early 2000s. and was held by a Republican from 1991 to 1999.  However, since the 2000s round of redistricting, only the Milwaukee-based 4th District is considered more Democratic.  John Kerry won the district in 2004 with 62% of the vote. Barack Obama also swept the district in 2008 with 69% of the vote to John McCain's 30%.

Counties and municipalities within the district

Dane County
 Belleville, Black Earth, Blue Mounds, Brooklyn, Cambridge, Cottage Grove, Cross Plains, Dane, Deerfield, DeForest, Fitchburg, Madison, Maple Bluff, Marshall, Mazomanie, McFarland, Middleton, Monona, Mount Horeb, Oregon, Rockdale, Shorewood Hills, Stoughton, Sun Prairie (city), Verona, Waunakee, and Windsor.

Green County
 Albany, Brodhead, Browntown, Monroe, Monticello, and New Glarus.

Iowa County
 Arena, Avoca, Barneveld, Cobb, Dodgeville, Highland, Hollandale, Linden, Mineral Point, Muscoda (Iowa County side), Rewey, and Ridgeway.

Lafayette County
 Argyle, Belmont, Benton, Blanchardville, Darlington, Gratiot, Shullsburg, and South Wayne.

Rock County
 Edgerton, Evansville, Footville, and Orfordville.

Sauk County
 Baraboo, Lake Delton, Loganville, Merrimac, North Freedom, Plain, Prairie du Sac, Reedsburg, Rock Springs, Spring Green, Sauk City, and Wisconsin Dells (Sauk County section).

List of members representing the district

Recent election results

2002 district boundaries (2002–2011)

2011 district boundaries (2012–2021)

Election results from presidential races

References

External links 
2nd Congressional District of Wisconsin

 Congressional Biographical Directory of the United States 1774–present

02